Ram Tahal Choudhary (born 1942) is an Indian politician,  Educationalist, philanthropist. He was a BJP member of the Lok Sabha from Ranchi in Jharkhand from 1991 to 2004, and then 2014 to 2019. He used to belong to Bharatiya Janata Party, but resigned from the party when he was denied a ticket for 2019 Lok Sabha polls. He contested from Ranchi as an independent in 2019 but polled less than 2.5% votes. He had earlier served as member of Bihar Legislative Assembly.

Early life 
Ram Tahal Choudhary is son of Late Dashrath Choudhary. He was born in Kuchchu village in  Ormanjhi Block  of Ranchi district. His father's name was Dashrath Choudhary and mother's name  Janki Devi. He married Savitri Devi and has two sons and two daughters. He is a Hindu by religion and Kurmi by caste.

Career
He was chief of Gram panchayat in kuchchu village in Ormanjhi. Then he elected to Bihar legislative assembly from 1969 to 71 and 1972 to 1977. Then he was head of gram panchayat of Ormanjhi from 1977 to 1996. Then he became president of Bharatiya Janata party in Ranchi in 1988. In 1991 and 1996, he became member of Parliament of Lokshabha for two terms. Then he re-elected to Lokshabha in 1988 and again in 1999. In 2014, he again elected to Lokshabha.

Philanthropy 
Ram Tahal Choudhary is a well known philanthropist. He has established many educational institutions in Ranchi. He established Ram Tahal Choudhary High School in 1978 by Ram Tahal Choudhary in Buti Ranchi. This school is affiliated to CBSE, Delhi and comes under CBSE, Patna zone. He established Ram Tahal Choudhary Institute of Technology (RTCIT) in 2008 and is affiliated from Ranchi University and is approved by All India Council of Technical Education. He also established Ram Tahal Choudhary B.Ed College and is affiliated from Ranchi University.

Ram Tahal Choudhary High School 
Ram Tahal Choudhary High School is a school established in 1978 by Ram Tahal Choudhary in Buti Ranchi. This school is affiliated to CBSE, Delhi and comes under CBSE, Patna zone.

Ram Tahal Choudhary Institute of Technology (RTCIT) 
RTCIT was established in 2008 and is affiliated from Ranchi University and is approved by All India Council of Technical Education.

Ram Tahal Choudhary B.ed College 
This college is known as RTC B.ed College. This college is providing Bachelor of Education degree and is affiliated from Ranchi University

Ram Tahal Chaudhary Petrol Pump
He owns several petrol pumps in Jharkhand state.

References

Lok Sabha members from Jharkhand
People from Ranchi district
1942 births
Living people
India MPs 2014–2019
India MPs 1996–1997
India MPs 1998–1999
India MPs 1999–2004
Bharatiya Janata Party politicians from Jharkhand
India MPs 1991–1996
Politicians from Ranchi